El Sueño De Morfeo, is the title of El Sueño De Morfeo's eponymous first studio album, which was released in Spain on March 3, 2005. The lead single (and debut from the band under the El Sueño De Morfeo name), Nunca Volverá, spent 4 non-consecutive weeks at number one in Spain. El Sueño De Morfeo entered and peaked on the Promusicae Album Chart at number four. The album went on to reach double Platinum status, selling 80,000 copies in Spain alone, and 150,000 worldwide. In support of the album, they embarked on a tour of Spain, playing over 100 concerts before travelling to play shows in Central and South America, such as Argentina and Mexico.

After the release of the album, they were recognized in 2005 with a MTV Europe Music Awards nomination for Best Spanish Act, although they eventually lost to El Canto del Loco. They also received an AMAS award, honouring them from the Asturian music community.

Track listing

All songs written and composed by El Sueño de Morfeo.

Singles

"Nunca Volvera"

"Nunca Volvera" – the second single released by El Sueño De Morfeo in 2005 under the label WM Spain. The song won the first place in the PROMUSICAE, 2005. For the song was filmed video.

Music video
The videoclip was the first in the repertoire of the group. Filmed 2005 Spain. The video begins with memories of the past events which «never come back». It shows guitarist of the band working on a typewriter, which was long ago replaced by the computers. Another guitarist is watching a video of his childhood on the videotape and videocassette), which were replaced by DVD drives. And the vocalist Raquel Rosario reviews and tears the old photos. In the chorus the group each time appears in a spare room, accompanied by a drummer and bagpiper. At the end of the video Raquel Rosario paints on the walls a label "Nunca volvera" and the light turns out.

Participants
 Raquel del Rosario – vocals
 David Feito – guitar, back vocals
 Juan Luis Suarez – guitar

"Okupa de Tu Corazon"
"Okupa de Tu Corazón" is a song of the Spanish band El Sueño De Morfeo, which became the third radio-single from the eponymous album El Sueño De Morfeo (2005).

In 2007 the song was performed during the "MTV Day". Literally, the name of the song is translated as "Take Your Heart".

Music video
The official video was filmed in Spain in 2005. It consists of two parts (a mixture of a video and concert recording). The film shows the band playing on the roof of one of the highly storey houses. And in the chorus a melody acquires Celtic sound.

"Esta Soy Yo"

"Ésta Soy Yo" - the third single, released by El Sueño de Morfeo from their album El Sueño de Morfeo (2005). The single was released in 2006.

Music video
The music video for "Ésta soy yo" was shot in 2008 with help of WMG. The video shows Raquel del Rosario singing in her room. Than appear all members of the band (David Feito and Juan Luis Suárez), who lead themselves up in front of the mirror. At the end of the video all members load the guns and  rifles sitting at the table, and after it go away. And on the table remains a photo of participants of the group with aim around their heads.

References

2007 albums
El Sueño de Morfeo albums